The Wallasey pub shooting was a mass shooting on 24 December 2022 at 23:50 (GMT). The shooting occurred at the Lighthouse pub in Wallasey Village, a district of Wallasey, Merseyside, England. One person was killed and four others were injured, one critically.

An investigation into the attack began early the next day.

Shooting 
Merseyside Police said that officers were called to the Lighthouse Inn in Wallasey Village just after 11:50 p.m. on 24 December 2022 following reports of gunshots. Police said that a gunman fired several shots towards the front entrance of the pub, which was packed with mostly young people at the time.

A 26-year-old woman, named as Elle Edwards, was taken to Arrowe Park Hospital after she suffered a serious gunshot injury to her head, and died shortly after. Four other men were also taken to hospital with gunshot wounds, one of whom, a 28-year-old man, was in critical condition. On 30 December, police said that the condition of the man critically hurt in the shooting was no longer life-threatening, and that the other three injured had been released from hospital.

Investigation 
Early on 25 December, the day after the shooting, Merseyside Police confirmed that a murder investigation was underway to establish the circumstances of what had taken place. They also said that a cordon had been established in the area whilst officers carry out witness enquiries and examine any CCTV footage.

Detective Superintendent Dave McCaughrean said that they believe the gunman left the pub car park in a dark coloured vehicle – possibly a dark coloured Mercedes – shortly after the shooting.

He also appealed to members of the public and anyone who was in the pub at the time of the shooting to come forward with information, saying "I would ask anyone who was in the Lighthouse in Wallasey Village last night who witnessed the incident or has mobile or CCTV footage of what happened to contact us as a matter of urgency."

Police have said they do not believe the woman who was killed was targeted.

On 26 December police arrested two people and took them into custody over the shooting. A 19-year-old woman from Rock Ferry was arrested on suspicion of conspiracy to murder, whilst a 30-year-old man from Tranmere was arrested on suspicion of murder and attempted murder. Police said that the investigation remained ongoing.

On 29 December, police said they had arrested a third person, a 31-year-old man from Tranmere, in connection with the murder and had taken him into custody on suspicion of conspiracy to murder. They also said that the other two people who had been arrested remained in custody.

On 30 December, police said that the 19-year-old woman who had been arrested was bailed and that the 30-year-old man was recalled to prison on licence. The 31-year-old man remained in custody, and police said enquiries into the shooting remain ongoing.

On 31 December it was said that the 31-year-old man who was arrested a couple days earlier had been released on bail.

On 3 January 2023 it was reported by Merseyside Police that almost 150 pieces of intelligence had been received from the public in relation to the shooting.

On 11 January, police said that a 22-year-old man was arrested on suspicion of murder following enquiries in mid-Wales, as well as a 23-year-old woman arrested on suspicion of assisting an offender, both were from the Wirral. These arrests brought the total number of people arrested in connection to the shooting to five.

Early on 13 January, police said that the 22-year-old man, named as Connor Chapman, has been charged with the murder of Elle Edwards. He had also been charged with two counts of attempted murder, three counts of unlawful and malicious wounding with intent to do grievous bodily harm, possession of a firearm with intent to endanger life, possession of ammunition with intent to endanger life, and handling stolen goods, namely a Mercedes A Class. He is due to appear at Wirral Adult Remand Court later in the day. The 23-year-old woman was released on bail. The police also said that the investigation was still ongoing.

Honorary Recorder of Liverpool, Judge Andrew Menary KC, remanded Chapman in custody to appear for a plea and trial preparation hearing on 17 April. Chapman is due to stand trial for nine offences related to the shooting, including murder and possession of a submachine gun, with a fixed date of 7 June.

Reactions 
Wallasey MP Dame Angela Eagle tweeted "This is heartbreaking news - My thoughts are with the family of the woman who has died & those who are injured." and appealed to the public to go to the police if they have any information about the attacks.

Wirral Council leader Janette Williamson said the shooting was "nothing less than despicable".

The pub where the shooting occurred was closed on 25 January 2023, one month after the shooting, as a mark of respect, with flowers being left at the entrance.

Aftermath
An inquest, chaired by Anita Bhardwaj, Area Croner for Liverpool and Wirral, was opened on 5 January 2023, and adjourned until 5 May following a brief hearing. A foundation to tackle gun violence, the Elle Edwards Foundation, was established in her memory by her father. Edwards' funeral was held at St Nicholas Church, Wallasey on 25 January, and attended by several hundred mourners.

References 

2020s in Merseyside
2020s mass shootings in the United Kingdom
2022 mass shootings in Europe
Attacks in the United Kingdom in 2022
Attacks on bars in the United Kingdom
Crime in Merseyside
December 2022 crimes in Europe
December 2022 events in the United Kingdom
Wallasey